Alexiewicz or Aleksiewicz is a Polish surname of East Slavic origin. It is a Patronymic surname literally meaning "son of Alexius". The Belarusian spelling of the surname is Alexievich. Notable people with this surname include:

Andrzej Alexiewicz (1917-1995), Polish mathematician
 (1884-1957), Polish military physician
Norbert Aleksiewicz (1948 –  1994), Polish politician 
Svetlana Alexievich (born 1948), Belarusian writer

Polish-language surnames
Patronymic surnames
Surnames from given names